Michael Reynolds (born 30 July 1963) is a former Australian rules footballer who played with Melbourne in the Victorian Football League (VFL).

Notes

External links 
		
DemonWiki page

1963 births
Australian rules footballers from Tasmania
Melbourne Football Club players
Living people